The University of the Llanos, also known as Unillanos, is a national public, coeducational university based in the city of Villavicencio, Meta, Colombia.

See also

 List of universities in Colombia

References

External links
 University of the Llanos official site 

Universities and colleges in Colombia